Asheqlu (also Romanized as ‘Āsheqlū; also known as Ashagly, Ashakhli, Ashāqlī, Asheghloo Meikhan, and Āsheqlī) is a village in Minjavan-e Gharbi Rural District of Minjavan District, Khoda Afarin County, East Azerbaijan province, Iran. At the 2006 National Census, its population was 473 in 116 households, when it was in the former Khoda Afarin District of Kaleybar County. The following census in 2011 counted 519 people in 140 households, by which time Khoda Afarin District had been elevated to the status of a county and divided into three districts. The latest census in 2016 showed a population of 534 people in 168 households; it was the largest village in its rural district.

References 

Khoda Afarin County

Populated places in East Azerbaijan Province

Populated places in Khoda Afarin County